Nepal International Film Festival is an annual film festival in Nepal. The festival was started in 2018. The last iteration of NIFF was scheduled for 6 – 10 May 2021. The next iteration was scheduled for 24 - 28 March 2022.

Awards

References

External links 

 

Film festivals in Nepal
2018 establishments in Nepal